Navid Nasseri (born 26 July 1996) is an Iranian-English professional footballer who plays for Macclesfield.

Club career
Nasseri played for the Manchester United Academy until the age of 16. He subsequently had stints with the academies of Crewe Alexandra, Blackburn Rovers and Bury.

Nasseri joined Birmingham City on a one-year deal in July 2014 and was assigned to the development squad. After making eight appearances for the side, his contract was terminated by mutual consent.

On 28 October 2016, Nasseri signed for Macclesfield Town. In the winter of 2017, he trialled with Swedish clubs AIK and GIF Sundsvall. In March 2017, he joined Syrianska in the same country.

On 26 January 2018, Nasseri signed with League One club Gillingham for the remainder of the season. He made his professional debut on 10 March, coming on as a late substitute in a 3–1 away win against Portsmouth. He scored a goal in his first start for the club on 29 March 2018 against MK Dons. He signed a one-year deal with the club in May 2018, but he made just four further league appearances for the club before his contract was cancelled by mutual consent in January 2019.

After an unsuccessful trial with Dutch side RKC Waalwijk, Nasseri signed for NIFL Premiership side Glentoran in October 2019. He scored on his debut on 9 October 2019 as the club fell to a 2–1 defeat to Coleraine in the Northern Ireland Football League Cup, before making his full league debut three days later in a 3–1 win over Carrick Rangers. On 31 July 2020, Nasseri and Glentoran won the 2019–20 Irish Cup.

The day after winning the Irish Cup it was announced that Nasseri had signed for Linfield. Nasseri made his Linfield debut in a UEFA Champions League Preliminary round game against Tre Fiori. On 16 August 2021 it was announced Nasseri had signed for Larne, as part of a player exchange deal involving Martin Donnelly.

Nasseri left Larne in the summer of 2022, and was without a club until joining Macclesfield in February 2023.

Career statistics

Club

Honours
Glentoran
Irish Cup: 2019–20

Linfield
 NIFL Premiership: 2020-21
Irish Cup: 2020-21

Larne
County Antrim Shield: 2021-22

References

External links

1996 births
Living people
English footballers
Iranian footballers
Association football midfielders
Bury F.C. players
Macclesfield Town F.C. players
Syrianska FC players
Gillingham F.C. players
Glentoran F.C. players
Linfield F.C. players
English Football League players
English expatriate footballers
English expatriate sportspeople in Sweden
Iranian expatriate sportspeople in Sweden
English people of Iranian descent
British Asian footballers
Sportspeople of Iranian descent
Iranian expatriate sportspeople in England